Arthur Austin may refer to:

 Arthur W. Austin (1807–1884), American attorney and government official
 Arthur Austin (cricketer) (1873–1962), Guyanese cricketer
 Arthur O. Austin (1879–1964), American electrical engineer and inventor.
 Arthur E. Austin (1891–1976), member of the Wisconsin State Assembly
 Arthur Everett Austin Jr. (1900–1957), director of the Wadsworth Atheneum
 Arthur Austin (water polo) (1902–1962), American water polo player